Oplitidae is a family of mites in the order Mesostigmata.

Species

 Cariboplitis Sellnick, 1963
 Cariboplitis almerodai (Hiramatsu & Hirschmann, 1991)
 Cariboplitis daressalami (Wisniewski, 1980)
 Cariboplitis ellipsoides (Hirschmann, 1991)
 Cariboplitis evansi (Hirschmann, 1983)
 Cariboplitis naetaensis (Marais & Loots, 1981)
 Cariboplitis pecki (Hirschmann, 1991)
 Cariboplitis pecksimilis (Hirschmann, 1991)
 Cariboplitis testigosensis Sellnick, 1963
 Cariboplitis tonopilus (J. F. Marais & G. C. Loots, 1981)
 Cariboplitis trínidadis (Hirschmann, 1991)
 Latotutulioplitis W. Hirschmann, 1984
 Latotutulioplitis labyrinthi (Hirschmann, 1984)
 Latotutulioplitis latotutuli (Hirschmann, 1984)
 Latotutulioplitis ootutuli (Hirschmann, 1984)
 Latotutulioplitis radiata (Hirschmann, 1984)
 Latotutulioplitis tutuli (Hirschmann, 1984)
 Latotutulioplitis zavattarii (Valle, 1955)
 Latotutulioplitis zicsii (Zirngiebl-Nicol & Hirschmann, 1973)
 Marginura Sellnick, 1926
 Marginura adhaerens Sellnick, 1926
 Marginura apicata (Banks, 1916)
 Marginura attaae (Hirschmann, 1972)
 Marginura fraterna (Banks, 1916)
 Marginura granulata (Hunter & Farrier, 1976)
 Marginura guineae (Hirschmann, 1991)
 Marginura internata (Banks, 1916)
 Marginura interrupta (Berlese, 1916)
 Marginura litoralis (Hunter & Farrier, 1976)
 Oplitis Berlese, 1884
 Oplitis akkeshiensis Hiramatsu, 1981
 Oplitis aktia Hunter & Farrier, 1976
 Oplitis alienorum Hunter & Farrier, 1976
 Oplitis alophora (Berlese, 1903)
 Oplitis alta (Sellnick, 1973)
 Oplitis altasimilis (Hirschmann, 1977)
 Oplitis angustifolia Hirschmann, 1984
 Oplitis anisa Hunter & Farrier, 1976
 Oplitis aokii Hiramatsu, 1979
 Oplitis arboricavi Hunter & Farrier, 1976
 Oplitis athiasae Zirngiebl-Nicol & Hirschmann, 1973
 Oplitis baloghi (Zirngiebl-Nicol & Hirschmann, 1977)
 Oplitis baloghisimilis Zirngiebl-Nicol & Hirschmann, 1973
 Oplitis barbata Hiramatsu, 1978
 Oplitis beccarii (Berlese, 1904)
 Oplitis belizensis Hirschmann, 1991
 Oplitis berleseiphiloctena Hirschmann, 1991
 Oplitis bispinosa (Wisniewski & Hirschmann, 1991)
 Oplitis bispirata (Selnick, 1954)
 Oplitis blufftonensis Hunter & Farrier, 1976
 Oplitis boliviensis Hirschmann, 1991
 Oplitis brasiliensis (Sellnick, 1926)
 Oplitis calceolata (Berlese, 1916)
 Oplitis camponoti Hirschmann, 1991
 Oplitis carteretensis Hunter & Farrier, 1976
 Oplitis castrii Zirngiebl-Nicol & Hirschmann, 1973
 Oplitis castriisimilis Zirngiebl-Nicol & Hirschmann, 1973
 Oplitis catemacoensis (Hirschmann, 1977)
 Oplitis cheleuta Hunter & Farrier, 1976
 Oplitis circularis Hiramatsu, 1978
 Oplitis communis Hunter & Farrier, 1976
 Oplitis comparata (Banks, 1916)
 Oplitis concinna Hiramatsu, 1983
 Oplitis conspicua (Berlese, 1903)
 Oplitis cornelli Hirschmann, 1991
 Oplitis cristobalensis Hirschmann, 1991
 Oplitis cubana Wisniewski & Hirschmann, in Hirschmann 1991
 Oplitis dakotensis McDaniel & Bolen, 1980
 Oplitis delicia Fox, 1957
 Oplitis dictyoeides Zirngiebl-Nicol & Hirschmann, 1973
 Oplitis dimidiata Hirschmann, 1991
 Oplitis dimidiatasimilis Hirschmann & Wisniewski, in Hirschmann 1991
 Oplitis disparata (Banks, 1916)
 Oplitis domsthorpii (Hüll, 1921)
 Oplitis endrodyi Zirngiebl-Nicol & Hirschmann, 1973
 Oplitis euchroeana Wisniewski & Hirschmann, in Hirschmann 1991
 Oplitis exigua (Fox, 1949)
 Oplitis exopodi Hunter & Farrier, 1976
 Oplitis exsectoidesorum Hunter & Farrier, 1976
 Oplitis farrieri Gorirossi Bourdeau, 1993
 Oplitis floreanae Hirschmann, 1991
 Oplitis fofanai Hirschmann, 1991
 Oplitis franzi Hirschmann & Zirngiebl-Nicol, 1969
 Oplitis garibaldii Hunter & Farrier, 1976
 Oplitis ghanaovalis Zirngiebl-Nicoi, & Hirschmann, 1973
 Oplitis gyotokui Hiramatsu, 1979
 Oplitis haradai Hiramatsu, 1983
 Oplitis hiramatsui Wisniewski, 1979
 Oplitis hirschmanni (Hiramatsu, 1979)
 Oplitis indicus Wisniewski & Hirschmann, 1995
 Oplitis inexplicata (Wisniewski & Hirschmann, 1991)
 Oplitis infumata (Berlese, 1916)
 Oplitis inopina (Hull, 1923)
 Oplitis irae Hirschmann, 1984
 Oplitis itoi Hiramatsu, 1979
 Oplitis jakubi (Bloszyk & Athias-Binche, 1986)
 Oplitis japanominutissima Hiramatsu, 1979
 Oplitis jilinensis Ma, 2001
 Oplitis kaszabi (Zirngiebl-Nicol & Hirschmann, 1973)
 Oplitis kaszabisimilis Zirngiebl-Nicol & Hirschmann, 1973
 Oplitis krasinskayae Hirschmann, 1984
 Oplitis laevis Wisniewski & Hirschmann, 1995
 Oplitis lalapi Hiramatsu & Hirschmann, in Hirschmann 1991
 Oplitis lapidaria Hirschmann, 1991
 Oplitis lasiocornelli Hirschmann, 1991
 Oplitis lasiorum Hirschmann, 1991
 Oplitis latifolia Hirschmann, 1984
 Oplitis latisaetigera Masan, 1999
 Oplitis leonardiana (Berlese, 1903)
 Oplitis lindquisti (Hirschmann, 1977)
 Oplitis loksai (Zirngiebl-Nicol & Hirschmann, 1977)
 Oplitis luzonensis Hiramatsu & Hirschmann, in Hirschmann 1991
 Oplitis macclellam Hunter & Farrier, 1976
 Oplitis maeandralis Zirngiebl-Nicol & Hirschmann, 1973
 Oplitis magna (Zirngiebl-Nicol & Hirschmann, 1977)
 Oplitis mahunkai Zirngiebl-Nicol & Hirschmann, 1973
 Oplitis mahunkaisimilis Zirngiebl-Nicol & Hirschmann, 1973
 Oplitis margaritaensis Hirschmann, 1979
 Oplitis marginalis Hirschmann, 1991
 Oplitis mayae Hirschmann, 1991
 Oplitis mexicana (Hirschmann, 1977)
 Oplitis minutissima (Berlese, 1903)
 Oplitis mirabilis (Hirschmann, 1973)
 Oplitis mollis Hiramatsu, 1983
 Oplitis moseri Hirschmann, 1972
 Oplitis mystacina (Trägårdh, 1952)
 Oplitis nagasakiensis Hiramatsu, 1976
 Oplitis natalensis (Marais & Loots, 1981)
 Oplitis neptuni (Schuster, 1958)
 Oplitis nicolae Hirschmann, 1991
 Oplitis nitida (Womersley, 1959)
 Oplitis nontransversaria Zirngiebl-Nicol & Hirschmann, 1973
 Oplitis oblita Hirschmann, 1991
 Oplitis ogasawaraensis Hiramatsu, 1979
 Oplitis onishii Hiramatsu, 1980
 Oplitis ovatula (Berlese, 1903)
 Oplitis pangasuganensis Hiramatsu & Hirschmann, in Hirschmann 1991
 Oplitis paradoxa (G.Canestrini & Berlese, 1884)
 Oplitis paraguayensis Hirschmann, 1991
 Oplitis pecinai Hirschmann, 1984
 Oplitis penicillata (Zirngiebl-Nicol & Hirschmann, 1977)
 Oplitis pennsylvanica (Berlese, 1903)
 Oplitis perigenitalis Hirschmann, 1991
 Oplitis philoctena (Trouessart, 1902)
 Oplitis piedmontensis Hunter & Farrier, 1976
 Oplitis potchefstroomensis (Ryke, 1958)
 Oplitis punctata Masan, 1999
 Oplitis pusilia (Berlese, 1888)
 Oplitis rarosi Hiramatsu & Hirschmann, 1991
 Oplitis reticulata Zirngiebl-Nicol & Hirschmann, 1973
 Oplitis retrobarbatulus (Berlese, 1916)
 Oplitis ricasoliana (Berlese, 1889)
 Oplitis rotunda (Zirngiebl-Nicol & Hirschmann, 1977)
 Oplitis sabulosa Hiramatsu, 1979
 Oplitis salebrosa Masan, 1999
 Oplitis salinasi Hiramatsu & Hirschmann, in Hirschmann 1991
 Oplitis sarcinulus Hunter & Farrier, 1976
 Oplitis schatzi Hirschmann, 1991
 Oplitis schmitzi (Kneissl, 1908)
 Oplitis schusteri (Hirschmann & Zirngiebl-Nicol, 1972)
 Oplitis serrata (Zirngiebl-Nicol & Hirschmann, 1977)
 Oplitis shibai (Hiramatsu, 1980)
 Oplitis signata (Hüll, 1918)
 Oplitis silvahirschmanni Hiramatsu, 1979
 Oplitis similibispirata Zirngiebl-Nicol & Hirschmann, 1973
 Oplitis similiminutissima Hiramatsu, 1979
 Oplitis solmani Wisniewski & Hirschmann, in Hirschmann 1991
 Oplitis southplazae Hirschmann, 1991
 Oplitis stammeri Hirschmann & Zirngiebl-Nicol, 1961
 Oplitis structura (Hirschmann, 1991)
 Oplitis subcorticalis Hirschmann & Wisniewski, in Hirschmann 1991
 Oplitis szunyeghyi Hirschmann, 1983
 Oplitis termitophila Ztrngiebl-Nicol & Hirschmann, 1973
 Oplitis trachymyrmecon Hunter & Farrier, 1976
 Oplitis trispinosa (Wisniewski & Hirschmann, 1991)
 Oplitis uncinata Zirngiebl-Nicol & Hirschmann, 1973
 Oplitis uvsnuurensis Wisnewski & Hirschmann, in Hirschmann 1991
 Oplitis villosella (Berlese, 1903)
 Oplitis vinalica (Wisniewski & Hirschmann, 1991)
 Oplitis virgilinus Hunter & Farrier, 1976
 Oplitis wasmanni (Kneissl, 1907)
 Oplitis woelkei Hirschmann, 1975
 Oplitis yuxini Ma, 2001
 Wisniewskiioplitis W. Hirschmann, 1984
 Wisniewskiioplitis hirschmanni (Wisniewski, 1979)
 Wisniewskiioplitis wisniewskii (Hirschmann, 1984)

References

Mesostigmata
Acari families